The Calyptocephalellidae are a family of toads (although not true members of the Bufonidae) found in Chile containing two living genera, Calyptocephalella and Telmatobufo. 

The genus Calyptocephalella contains one living species, the helmeted water toad (C. gayi), which is very large and mostly aquatic. The genus Telmatobufo contains four species, T. australis, T. bullocki, T. ignotus, and T. venustus. All five living species within the family are considered threatened, with T. bullocki and T. venustus being classified as critically endangered. 

The family has been present in southern South America since the Late Cretaceous and were present in the Antarctic Peninsula during the Eocene. While originally widespread in Patagonia east of the Andes, they later became extinct in this region after the Late Miocene, likely due to increasingly cold and arid conditions. A particularly large indeterminate fossil species is known from the Eocene of southern Chile.

They are the sister group to the superfamily Myobatrachoidea, which inhabits Australasia; the ancestors of Myobatrachoidea likely diverged from Calyptocephalellidae in South America, but migrated south to Australasia via then ice-free Antarctica. Together, these groups comprise the clade Australobatrachia.

References

 
Australobatrachia
Amphibians of Chile
Endemic fauna of Chile
Amphibian families
Taxa named by Osvaldo Reig